A trimotor is a propeller-driven aircraft powered by three internal combustion engines, characteristically one on the nose and one on each wing. A compromise between complexity and safety, such a configuration was typically a result of the limited power of the engines available to the designer. Many trimotors were designed and built in the 1920s and 1930s as the most effective means of maximizing payload.

Other - and uncommon - configurations include engines above the wing, as on seaplanes, including in pusher configuration, and an engine on each wing and one on the tail.  

The best known trimotors are the Fokker F, Ford AT, and Junkers Ju series aircraft.

Gallery

List of trimotors

See also
 Trijet

References

Aircraft configurations
Trimotors
Lists of aircraft by power source

See also
 Trijet

Aircraft configurations
Trimotors
Lists of aircraft by power source